Swisher Gymnasium is a 1,360-seat multi-purpose arena in Jacksonville, Florida. Built in 1953, it is currently the home to the Jacksonville University Dolphins men and women's basketball teams.  Prior to the 2015–16 season, Jacksonville played its home games at both Swisher Gymnasium and the Jacksonville Veterans Memorial Arena.

In addition to athletic contests, Vice President Lyndon Baines Johnson addressed students in 1963 at the gymnasium. Swisher Gymnasium was also used for several concerts including Dionne Warwick (November 9, 1967), Billy Joel (March, 1975), and K.C. and the Sunshine Band (September 7, 1979). Swisher Gymnasium was also a contender as a site for one of the 2016 Presidential Debates, but was not selected as a finalist.

See also
 List of NCAA Division I basketball arenas

References

College basketball venues in the United States
Indoor arenas in Florida
Sports venues in Jacksonville, Florida
Jacksonville Dolphins men's basketball
1953 establishments in Florida
Sports venues completed in 1953
Basketball venues in Florida